Sky Net Airline is a charter airline from Armenia. It was founded in 2011 and commenced operations in 2013. The airline has its main hub at the Zvartnots International Airport and its fleet comprises one BAe Jetstream 31 aircraft.

Fleet

See also
 List of airlines of Armenia
 List of the busiest airports in Armenia
 Transport in Armenia

References 

Airlines of Armenia
Airlines established in 2011
Armenian companies established in 2011